The term acne cosmetica refers to acne caused by or aggravated by cosmetics.  The mechanism is thought to be chemically induced plugging of the pilosebaceous orifice.  This became a significant problem for dermatologists in the 1970s and 1980s, but with the improved formulations produced by cosmetic chemists , a diagnosis of acne cosmetica has become relatively rare in dermatological practice.

The terms "non-comedogenic" and "non-acne(i)genic" appeared on moisturizers and other cosmetic compounds as manufacturers introduced re-formulations—sometimes associated with claims that the products were "oil-free" or "water-based".  Although early work produced lists of comedogenic chemicals in various strengths and vehicles, it became apparent that one could not predict the actual comedogenicity of a product from its contents; rather, the finished product itself needed use-testing.

The production of a low-grade folliculitis by some components of cosmetic products has led to misdiagnosis on occasion.

People may not attribute skin reactions to their cosmetics at first, but may notice worsening symptoms after using certain face makeup, sunblock or lip products.
Reactions are more likely to occur if applied cosmetics are left on and not stripped after wearing them.

See also
 List of cutaneous conditions

References

External links 

Acneiform eruptions